Kyle Kelley (born June 28, 1985) is an American professional sports car racing driver in the Trans-Am Series' TA2 class. He has also raced in NASCAR, competing in the Nationwide Series from 2010 to 2013 as a road course ringer.

Racing career

Kelley began racing in the Trans-Am Series' TA2 class in 2009, eventually competing full-time the following year. In June 2010, in addition to the Trans-Am race at the track, he ran the inaugural NASCAR Nationwide Series race at Road America. Kelley continued making starts in NASCAR as a road course ringer through 2013, racing at Watkins Glen International, Circuit Gilles Villeneuve, and the series' first event at Mid-Ohio Sports Car Course in 2013.

In 2014, he won the SCCA National Championship Runoffs' GT1 class at Mazda Raceway Laguna Seca.

Motorsports career results

NASCAR
(key) (Bold – Pole position awarded by qualifying time. Italics – Pole position earned by points standings or practice time. * – Most laps led.)

Nationwide Series

K&N Pro Series West

References

External links

 

1985 births
NASCAR drivers
Trans-Am Series drivers
Living people
Sportspeople from Huntington Beach, California
Racing drivers from California